WS2B is a putative gene associated with Waardenburg syndrome type 2. It has not yet been isolated from its locus of chromosome 1p21–1p13.3 since it was first reported in 1994.

History 
This locus was first linked to Waardenburg syndrome in 1994, when the study that first identified mutations in MITF in patients with Waardenburg syndrome type 2 also found that some patients did not have any mutations in this region. A second 1994 study found a link to chromosome 1 in the locus 1p21–p13.3. This became known as type 2B of the condition, however it has not been documented since, and the gene responsible remains unknown.

References